Saint-Nicolas-de-la-Taille is a commune in the Seine-Maritime department in the Normandy region in northern France.

Geography

Population

Places of interest
 The church of St. Nicolas, dating from the sixteenth century.
 The fourteenth-century farmhouse of Rames.

See also
Communes of the Seine-Maritime department

References

Communes of Seine-Maritime